Sathruvu  is a 1991 Indian Telugu-language crime thriller film directed by Kodi Ramakrishna and produced by M. S. Raju under Sumanth Art Productions. It stars Venkatesh, Vijayashanti, and Kota Srinivasa Rao with music composed by Raj–Koti.

Released on 2 January 1991, the film received positive reviews and was successful at the box office. The film was remade in Hindi as Vijeta (1996).

Plot
Ashok is an advocate who works as a junior along with his two friends Raghava and Bhaskar for advocate Durga Prasad, who always fights for Justice. Durga Prasad and his wife Lakshmi  treat them as their own children. Venkataratnam is a powerful contractor who has the entire system in his hands. Once, Venkataratnam cheats the Govt. by saying that he has constructed the hostel for poor people without doing it, just showing it on papers. Durga Prasad takes up the case and gathers all the proofs against him. Venkataratnam threatens Durga Prasad a lot who does not yield to it. Finally, Venkataratnam kills Durga Prasad and his wife Lakshmi in front of the court and destroys all the evidence. Before dying, Durga Prasad takes a word from Ashok, that he should win this case under any circumstances. Ashok gives respect to his words and takes up the case, but he fails to get the case admitted because there is no evidence. In that frustration, Ashok reacts on Venkataratnam publicly in court. Finally, he is suspended from the court and arrested.

Now Ashok decides to take revenge against Venkataratnam and his gang. He eliminates Venkataratnam's men one by one which creates fear to Venkataratnam. So he sends his henchmen DIG Prakash Rao to hand over the case to ACP Vijaya, who was none other than Ashok's lover in his college days. Both of them challenge each other. Ashok challenges to complete his mission, while Vijaya challenges that she will stop him under any circumstance. During the process, Vijaya finds out that DIG works for Venkataratnam and collects all the proof for Venkatratnam's arrest. When she gets ready to arrest them, they plan to kill her. Ashok comes to her rescue and eliminates Venkataratnam and his entire gang. Finally, Ashok successfully completes his mission and the movie ends.

Cast

 Venkatesh as Ex Advocate Ashok
 Vijayashanti as ACP Vijaya 
 Kota Srinivasa Rao as Venkataratnam
 Captain Raju as DIG Prakash Rao
 Vijay Kumar as Durga Prasad
 Jaya Prakash Reddy as Mayor Gowdappa
 Anand Raj as Satya Murthy
 Babu Antony as Jorge
 Maharshi Raghava as Raghava 
 Nagesh as Contestable Ramayah
 Brahmanandam as Contestable Sambayah
 Babu Mohan as House Owner
 P. L. Narayana as Major Michel (Chintu's grandfather)
 Sangeetha as Lakshmi (Durga Prasad's wife)
 Kalpana Rai as House Owner's Wife
 Master Satish as Chintu

Production
M. S. Raju provided the basic story idea of the film and he chose Satya Murthy as the writer and together worked to develop the story line. The team hired Vijaya Shanti as heroine. During the making of the film, Vijayashanti had the film Karthavyam. Venky had two other films - Dhruva Nakshatram and Bobbili Raja - released at the same time. Initially, Kodi Rama Krishna opted for a newcomer for Kota's character, but Raju convinced Kodi Rama Krishna to take Kota for that character.

Soundtrack

Music composed by Raj–Koti. Music released on CAUVERY Audio Company.

References

External links

1990s Telugu-language films
1991 films
Indian courtroom films
Indian legal films
Indian action films
Indian crime thriller films
Films about corruption in India
1991 crime thriller films
Films scored by Raj–Koti
Telugu films remade in other languages